Jensvold is a surname. Notable people with this surname include:

 Leo Jensvold (1908–1966), American football player
 Lloyd Jensvold (1908–1981), American football player, twin brother of Leo
 Mary Lee Jensvold, senior lecturer at Central Washington University

Other
 Gulbrand and Bertha Jensvold House, historic farmhouse in Perry, Wisconsin